Parqaqucha (Quechua  two separate things which seem to be united, qucha lake, Hispanicized spelling Parjajocha) is a lake in Peru located in the Ayacucho Region, Lucanas Province, Cabana District.

See also
List of lakes in Peru

References

Lakes of Peru
Lakes of Ayacucho Region